The 2012–13 NOJHL season was the 35th season of the Northern Ontario Junior Hockey League (NOJHL). The seven teams of the NOJHL played 48-game schedules.

Come February, the top teams of each division will play down for the Copeland-McNamara Trophy, the NOJHL championship.  The winner of the Copeland-McNamara Trophy will compete in the Central Canadian Junior "A" championship, the Dudley Hewitt Cup.  If successful against the winners of the Ontario Junior Hockey League and Superior International Junior Hockey League, the champion would then move on to play in the Canadian Junior Hockey League championship, the 2013 Royal Bank Cup.

Changes 
Soo Eagles leave league for North American Hockey League.
Elliot Lake Bobcats join league from Greater Metro Junior A Hockey League.
Sudbury Cubs change ownership, renamed Sudbury Nickel Barons.

Current Standings 
Note: GP = Games played; W = Wins; L = Losses; OTL = Overtime losses; SL = Shootout losses; GF = Goals for; GA = Goals against; PTS = Points; x = clinched playoff berth; y = clinched division title; z = clinched conference title

Teams listed on the official league website.

Standings listed on official league website.

2012-13 Copeland-McNamara Trophy Playoffs

Playoff results are listed on the official league website.

Dudley Hewitt Cup Championship
Hosted by the North Bay Trappers in North Bay, Ontario.  North Bay finished 4th, while the Soo Thunderbirds finished 3rd.

Round Robin
St. Michael's Buzzers (OJHL) 4 - Soo Thunderbirds 2
North Bay Trappers 4 - Minnesota Wilderness (SIJHL) 1
Minnesota Wilderness (SIJHL) 7 - Soo Thunderbirds 0
St. Michael's Buzzers (OJHL) 5 - North Bay Trappers 2
Soo Thunderbirds 4 - North Bay Trappers 3 OT

Semi-final
St. Michael's Buzzers (OJHL) 5 - Soo Thunderbirds 1

Scoring leaders 
Note: GP = Games played; G = Goals; A = Assists; Pts = Points; PIM = Penalty minutes

Leading goaltenders 
Note: 1000 Minutes minimum; GP = Games played; Mins = Minutes played; W = Wins; L = Losses: OTL = Overtime losses; SL = Shootout losses; GA = Goals Allowed; SO = Shutouts; GAA = Goals against average

Awards
Top Defenceman (NOJHL Award) - Adam Newkirk (Blind River)
Most Improved (Gilles Laperriere Trophy) - Trevor Hunt (North Bay)
Top Defensive Forward (Mitch Tetreault Memorial Trophy) - Brandon Bazinet (Blind River)
Team Goaltending (NOJHL Award) - Greg Dodds/Dustin Hummel (North Bay)
Top GAA (Wayne Chase Memorial Award) - Greg Dodds (North Bay)
Top Scorer (Jimmy Conners Memorial Trophy) - Sebastien Leroux (Sudbury)
Most Valuable Player (Carlo Catterello Trophy) - Darcy Haines (Sudbury)
Top Rookie (John Grignon Trophy) - Joel Horodziejczyk (Soo)
Most Gentlemanly Player (Onaping Falls Huskies Trophy) - Brandon Janke (North Bay)
Top Team Player (NOJHL Trophy) - Darcy Casola (Soo)
Scholastic Award (NOJHL Trophy) - Tait Seguin (North Bay)
CJHL Scholastic Nominee Award - Tait Seguin (North Bay)
Playoff's Most Valuable Player (NOJHL Trophy) - Trevor Hunt (North Bay)
Coach of the Year (Mirl "Red" McCarthy Memorial Award) - Marc Lafleur (Kirkland Lake)
Top Executive (Joe Drago Trophy) - Rusty Joncas (Blind River)

See also 
 2013 Royal Bank Cup
 Dudley Hewitt Cup
 List of NOHA Junior A seasons
 Ontario Junior Hockey League
 Superior International Junior Hockey League
 Greater Ontario Junior Hockey League
 2012 in ice hockey
 2013 in ice hockey

References

External links 
 Official website of the Northern Ontario Junior Hockey League
 Official website of the Canadian Junior Hockey League

NOJHL
Northern Ontario Junior Hockey League seasons